Killai is a second-grade panchayat town in the Chidambaram taluk of the Cuddalore district of Tamil Nadu, India.

Geography
It is on the river's south bank, across from the town of Parangipettai. The only reserve forests in the taluk are located to the south of the town. The Killai and Pichavaram reserve forests, which contain mangrove forest ecosystems, also contain the Killai backwater, part of the Vellar River's estuary.

Demographics
In 2011, there were 3,359 households in the town, which had a population of 13,608 people. 6,851, or about 50.3% of the population were male, while 6,757, about 49.7%, were female. 1,710 children, about 12.6% of the town's population, were at or below the age of 6 in 2011. 4,236, about 31.1% of the population, were classified by the census as scheduled castes or scheduled tribes. 67.4% of the population was literate.

References

Cities and towns in Cuddalore district